Punjab National Bank (abbreviated as PNB) is a central public sector bank under the ownership of Ministry of Finance, Government of India. It is based in New Delhi. The bank was founded in May 1894 and is the third largest public sector bank in India in terms of its business volumes and second largest in terms of its network. The bank has over 180 million customers, 12,248 branches, and 13,000+ ATMs.

PNB has a banking subsidiary in the UK (PNB International Bank, with seven branches in the UK), as well as branches in Hong Kong, Kowloon, Dubai, and Kabul. It has representative offices in Almaty (Kazakhstan), Dubai (United Arab Emirates), Shanghai (China), Oslo (Norway), and Sydney (Australia). In Bhutan, it owns 51% of Druk PNB Bank, which has five branches. In Nepal, PNB owns 20% of Everest Bank, which has 122 branches. PNB also owns 41.64% of JSC (SB) PNB Bank in Kazakhstan, which has four branches.

History
Punjab National Bank is a PSU working under the government of India regulated by the Reserve Bank of India Act, 1934 and the Banking Regulation Act, 1949. It was registered on 19 May 1894 under the Indian Companies Act, with its office in Anarkali Bazaar, in pre-independent India (present-day Pakistan). The founding board was drawn from different parts of India professing different faiths and of varying backgrounds, with the common objective of creating a truly national bank that would further the economic interest of the country. PNB's founders included several leaders of the Swadeshi movement such as Dyal Singh Majithia and Lala Harkishen Lal, Lala Lalchand, Kali Prosanna Roy, E. C. Jessawala, Prabhu Dayal, Bakshi Jaishi Ram, and Lala Dholan Dass. Lala Lajpat Rai was actively associated with the management of the Bank in its early years. The board first met on 23 May 1894. The bank opened for business on 12 April 1895 in Lahore.

PNB is the first Indian bank to have been started solely with Indian capital that survives to the present earlier Oudh Commercial Bank was established in 1881, but failed in 1958.

Mahatma Gandhi, Jawaharlal Nehru, Lal Bahadur Shastri, Indira Gandhi and the Jalianwala Bagh Committee have held PNB accounts.

Timeline

In 1900 PNB established its first branch outside Lahore in India. Branches in Karachi and Peshawar followed. The next major event occurred in 1940 when PNB absorbed Bhagwan (or Bhugwan) Dass Bank, which had its head office in Dehra.

At the Partition of India and the creation of Pakistan, PNB lost its premises in Lahore, but continued to operate in Pakistan. Partition forced PNB to close 92 offices in West Pakistan, one-third of its total number of branches, and which held 40% of the total deposits. PNB still maintained a few caretaker branches. On 31 March 1947, even before Partition, PNB had decided to leave Lahore and transfer its registered office to India; it received permission from the Lahore High Court on 20 June 1947, at which time it established a new head office at Under Hill Road, Civil Lines in New Delhi. Lala Yodh Raj was the Chairman of the Bank.

In 1951, PNB acquired the 39 branches of Bharat Bank (est. 1942). Bharat Bank became Bharat Nidhi Ltd. In 1960, PNB again shifted its head office, this time from Calcutta to Delhi. In 1961, PNB acquired Universal Bank of India, which Ramakrishna Jain had established in 1938 in Dalmianagar, Bihar. PNB also amalgamated Indo Commercial Bank (est. 1932 by S. N. N. Sankaralinga Iyer) in a rescue. In 1963, The Burmese revolutionary government nationalised PNB's branch in Rangoon (now Yangon). This became People's Bank No. 7. After the Indo-Pak war of 1965, the government of Pakistan seized all the offices in Pakistan of Indian banks in September 1965. PNB also had one or more branches in East Pakistan (now Bangladesh).

The government of India (GOI) nationalised PNB and 13 other major commercial banks, on 19 July 1969. In 1976 or 1978, PNB opened a branch in London. some ten years later, in 1986, the Reserve Bank of India required PNB to transfer its London branch to State Bank of India after the branch was involved in a fraud scandal. That same year, 1986, PNB acquired Hindustan Commercial Bank (est. 1943) in a rescue. The acquisition added Hindustan's 142 branches to PNB's network. In 1993, PNB acquired New Bank of India, which the GOI had nationalised in 1980. In 1998 PNB set up a representative office in Almaty, Kazakhstan.

In 2003 PNB took over Nedungadi Bank, the oldest private sector bank in Kerala. At the time of the merger with PNB, Nedungadi Bank's shares had zero value, with the result that its shareholders received no payment for their shares. PNB also opened a representative office in London. In 2004, PNB established a branch in Kabul, Afghanistan, a representative office in Shanghai, and another in Dubai. PNB also established an alliance with Everest Bank in Nepal that permits migrants to transfer funds easily between India and Everest Bank's 12 branches in Nepal. Currently, PNB owns 20% of Everest Bank. Two years later, PNB established PNBIL – Punjab National Bank (International) – in the UK, with two offices, one in London, and one in Southall. Since then it has opened more branches, this time in Leicester, Birmingham, Ilford, Wembley, and Wolverhampton. PNB also opened a branch in Hong Kong. In January 2009, PNB established a representative office in Oslo, Norway. PNB hopes to upgrade this to a branch in due course. In January 2010, PNB established a subsidiary in Bhutan. PNB owns 51% of Druk PNB Bank, which has branches in Thimphu, Phuntsholing, and Wangdue. Local investors own the remaining shares. Then on 1 May, PNB opened its branch in Dubai's financial center. PNB purchased a small minority stake in Kazakhstan-based JSC Danabank established on 20 October 1992 in Pavlodar. Within the year PNB increased its ownership till 84% of what has become JSC (SB) PNB, with its share currently decreased to 49%. The associate in Kazakhstan now called JSC Tengri Bank has branches in Almaty, Nur-Sultan, Karaganda, Pavlodar and Shymkent. September 2011: PNB opened a representative office in Sydney, Australia. December 2012: PNB signed an agreement with US based life Insurance company MetLife to acquire a 30% stake in MetLife's Indian affiliate MetLife India Limited. The company would be renamed PNB MetLife India Limited and PNB would sell MetLife's products in its branches.

Punjab National Bank Fraud Case, 2018

PNB disclosed in February 2018 that it detected fraudulent transactions of up to $1.77 billion at just one of its branches.

Punjab National Bank Fraud Case, 2019 
In July 2019, the bank detected another fraud, worth  by Bhushan Power & Steel Ltd (BPSL).

Mergers and acquisitions

Amalgamation
On 30 August 2019, Finance Minister Nirmala Sitharaman announced that the Oriental Bank of Commerce and United Bank of India would be merged with Punjab National Bank. The Union Cabinet approved the merger on 4 March 2020. PNB announced that its board had approved the merger ratios the next day. Shareholders of Oriental Bank of Commerce and United Bank will receive 1,150 shares and 121 shares of PNB, respectively, for every 1,000 shares of they hold. On 1 April 2020, the merger came into effect. Post-merger, all customers of other two merging banks are now treated as the customers of PNB.

Services
In September 2022, Punjab National Bank launches WhatsApp banking for customers and non-customers. At present, it said, PNB would be offering non-financial services such as balance inquiry, last five transactions, stop cheque, request cheque book to its account holders through the WhatsApp banking service.

Other informative services that would be provided to both account and non-account holders include online account opening, enquire bank deposit/loan products, digital products, NRI services, locate branch/atm, opt-in, opt-out options.

The WhatsApp banking service will be available 24x7, including holidays, on both android and iOS-based mobile phones.

Listings and shareholding
PNB's equity shares are listed on Bombay Stock Exchange and the National Stock Exchange of India. It is a constituent of the CNX Nifty at the NSE. , the shareholding structure of the bank is as follows.

Subsidiaries 

 PNB Housing Finance Limited (32.52%)
 PNB MetLife India Insurance Company (32%)
 Canara HSBC OBC Life Insurance Co. Ltd (23%)
 India SME Asset Reconstruction Co. Ltd. (20.90%)
 PNB Cards and Services Ltd (100%)
 PNB Insurance Broking Services Ltd (non functional under winding up)
 PNB Investment Services Ltd (100%)
 PNB Gilts Ltd (74.07%)
 PNB International Ltd UK (100%) 
Druk PNB Bank Ltd Bhutan (51%)
 JSC Tengri Bank Kazakhstan (41.64%)
 Everest Bank Ltd Nepal (20.03%)
 sarva Haryana Gramin Bank  (35%)
 Himachal Gramin Bank (35%)
 Punjab Gramin Bank (35%)
 Prathma UP Gramin Bank (35%)
 Dakshin Bihar Gramin Bank (35%)
 Bangiya Gramin Vikash Bank(35%)
 Assam Gramin Vikas Bank (35%)
 Tripura Gramin Bank (35%)
 Manipur Rural Bank (35%)

Employees
As on 31 March 2019, the bank had 70,810 employees. As of 31 March 2019, it also had 1,722 employees with disabilities on the same date (2.43%). The average age of bank employees on the same date was 39 years. The company incurred  towards employee benefit expenses during the same financial year.

Corporate social responsibility
The bank incurred  on corporate social responsibility activities like medical camps, farmer training, tree plantations, blood donation camps etc. during the FY 2012–13.

Among many initiatives, one such effort is PNB Ladli, which started in 2014. The scheme initiated to promote education among girls of Rural / Semi-urban areas.

During the year 2018–19, PNB has also taken the initiative for donations to CM relief fund for Kerala and Kumbh Mela.

For the year FY18-19, PNB has initiated  for RSETIs.

To Help young talents in India the bank also initiated PNB Hockey Academy, one of the major efforts towards supporting the national games.

See also

 List of bank robbers and robberies#India
 Banking in India
 List of banks in India
 Indian Financial System Code
 List of largest banks
 List of companies of India
 Make in India

References

Further reading

External links

 

Public Sector Banks in India
Companies based in New Delhi
Banks established in 1894
Companies nationalised by the Government of India
Punjab National Bank
Indian companies established in 1894
Companies listed on the National Stock Exchange of India
Companies listed on the Bombay Stock Exchange